Earl of Annandale and Hartfell is a title in the Peerage of Scotland, created in 1661 for James Johnstone.

In 1625, the title of Earl of Annandale had been created for John Murray, but it became extinct when his son James died without heirs.

James Johnstone, son of Sir James Johnstone, Warden of the West Marches, was created Lord Johnstone of Lochwood in 1633, and in 1643, was further created Earl of Hartfell. Johnstone's son, also James, resigned the earldom and received a regrant of the title, as Earl of Annandale and Hartfell, in 1661, and a further regrant of the same title, but by crown charter, in 1662 to his heirs male of the body, whom failing, his heirs female of the body. William, the second Earl of Annandale and Hartfell, was created Marquess of Annandale in 1701. At the death of the third marquess, no one could prove a claim to the peerages of either earldoms and therefore they became dormant.

The earldoms remained dormant until Patrick Hope-Johnstone's claim was approved by the House of Lords in 1985. The Committee for Privileges ruled that Charles II's 1662 charter of regrant of lands constituted the creation of a new title. The title therefore descended through the female line in the person of Lady Henrietta Johnstone (who married Charles the First Earl of Hopetoun) to Patrick Hope-Johnstone.

The current earl holds the subsidiary title of Lord Johnstone (1662), in the peerage of Scotland.

The family seat is Raehills, near Lockerbie, Dumfriesshire.

Earls of Annandale (1625)
with subsidiaries Viscount of Annand and Lord Murray of Lochmaben (both c. 1622) and Lord Murray of Tyninghame (1625)
John Murray, 1st Earl of Annandale (d. 1640)
James Murray, 2nd Earl of Annandale (d. 1658) extinct.

Earls of Hartfell (1643)
with subsidiaries Lord Johnston of Lochwood (1633) and Lord Johnston of Lochwood, Moffatdale and Evandale (1643) extinct.
James Johnstone, 1st Earl of Hartfell (1602–1653)
James Johnstone, 2nd Earl of Hartfell (d. 1672)

Earls of Annandale and Hartfell (1661 and 1662)
James Johnstone, 1st Earl of Annandale and Hartfell (d. 1672)
William Johnstone, 2nd Earl of Annandale and Hartfell (d. 1721) (created Marquess of Annandale 1701)

Marquesses of Annandale (1701)
William Johnstone, 1st Marquess of Annandale (d. 1721)
James Johnstone, 2nd Marquess of Annandale (c. 1687–1730)
George Vanden-Bempde, 3rd Marquess of Annandale (1720–1792) (marquessate and 1661 and 1662 earldoms dormant 1792)

Earls of Annandale and Hartfell (1662)

Subsidiary title: Lord Johnstone (1662)
James Hope-Johnstone, 3rd Earl of Hopetoun (1741–1816), de jure 5th Earl of Annandale and Hartfell
Anne Hope-Johnstone (1768–1818) de jure 6th Countess of Annandale and Hartfell
John James Hope-Johnstone (1796–1876) de jure 7th Earl of Annandale and Hartfell
John James Hope-Johnstone (1842–1912) de jure 8th Earl of Annandale and Hartfell
Evelyn Wentworth Hope-Johnstone (1879–1964) de jure 9th Countess of Annandale and Hartfell
Percy Wentworth Hope-Johnstone (1909–1983) de jure 10th Earl of Annandale and Hartfell
Patrick Andrew Wentworth Hope-Johnstone, 11th Earl of Annandale and Hartfell (b. 1941) (revived 1985)

The heir apparent is the present holder's son David Patrick Wentworth Hope-Johnstone, Lord Johnstone (b. 1971).
The heir apparent's heir apparent is his son Percy John Wentworth Hope Johnstone, Master of Johnstone (b. 2002).

References

See also
Clan Johnstone

Earldoms in the Peerage of Scotland
Annandale and Eskdale
Annandale and Hartfell
Annandale
Earl
1661 establishments in Scotland
1662 establishments in Scotland
Noble titles created in 1661
Noble titles created in 1662
Peerages created with special remainders